Mülhauser Volksblatt was a daily newspaper published from Mulhouse, Alsace-Lorraine, Germany. It was the first Catholic daily newspaper in Mulhouse. Mülhauser Volksblatt was founded in 1892 by Henri Cetty, and rapidly became popular.

Mülhauser Volksblatt was banned in 1897, after having protested against the official birthday celebrations of the Emperor.

References

1892 establishments in Germany
1897 disestablishments in Germany
German-language newspapers published in Alsace-Lorraine
Mass media in Mulhouse
Daily newspapers published in Germany
Publications established in 1892
Publications disestablished in 1897
Defunct newspapers published in Germany